Edwin Andrew Sparr (July 29, 1898 – May 19, 1974) was a player in the National Football League for the Racine Tornadoes in 1926 as a tackle. He played at the collegiate level at Carroll University.

Sparr was born in Hazelhurst, Wisconsin. He attended Wausau High School in Wausau, Wisconsin.

References

1898 births
1974 deaths
Players of American football from Wisconsin
People from Oneida County, Wisconsin
Sportspeople from Wausau, Wisconsin
Carroll University alumni
Racine Tornadoes players